Pirania is an extinct genus of sea sponge known from the Middle Cambrian Burgess Shale and the Ordovician Fezouata formation. It is named after Mount St. Piran, a mountain situated in the Bow River Valley in Banff National Park, Alberta. It was first described in 1920 by Charles Doolittle Walcott. 198 specimens of Pirania are known from the Greater Phyllopod bed, where they comprise 0.38% of the community.

References

External links 
 

Burgess Shale fossils
Protomonaxonida
Burgess Shale sponges
Prehistoric sponge genera
Cambrian first appearances
Middle Ordovician extinctions
Taxa named by Charles Doolittle Walcott
Fossil taxa described in 1920

Cambrian genus extinctions